The women's javelin throw was an event at the 1956 Summer Olympics in Melbourne, Australia. The qualifying round mark was set at 43.00m. Five athletes didn't surpass that distance in the heats.

Summary
Nadezhda Konyayeva entered as the world record holder, having set the record almost 3 years earlier.  Dana Zátopková was the returning champion.  The leading qualifier was 18 year old Karen Anderson, throwing 49.64m on her first attempt.  But she was unable to match that in the final.  On her first throw of the final, Inese Jaunzeme set the Olympic record with a 51.63m throw.  Ingrid Almqvist moved into second with a 49.74m while Konyayeva was third.  With a 50.28m in the second round, Konyayeva moved into second place, with Zátopková moving into third.  The medal positions held until the fifth round when Marlene Ahrens threw 50.38m to leap from fifth place to silver.  On her final attempt for punctuation, Jaunzeme added more than two meters, almost seven feet to the Olympic record, throwing .  Ahrens was the first and still only Olympic medal for a Chilean woman.

Medalists

Final classification

References

External links
 Official Report
 Results

W
Javelin throw at the Olympics
1956 in women's athletics
Women's events at the 1956 Summer Olympics